Eucephalus gormanii is a North American species of flowering plant in the family Asteraceae known by the common name Gorman’s aster. It grows on rocky slopes and on cliffs at high elevations in the Cascade Mountains of the US State of Oregon.

Eucephalus gormanii is a perennial herb up to 40 cm (16 inches) tall, with short rhizomes and a woody caudex. Stems are hairless. One plant will usually produce 2-5 flower heads per stem. Each head has 5-13 white ray florets surrounding numerous yellow  disc florets.

References

Astereae
Flora of Oregon
Plants described in 1916
Flora without expected TNC conservation status
Endemic flora of Oregon
Endemic flora of the United States